Southeastern Community College may refer to:
Southeastern Community College (Iowa), a public community college in West Burlington, Iowa whose teams are called the Blackhawks
Southeastern Community College (North Carolina), a public community college in Whiteville, North Carolina whose teams are called the Rams

See also
Southeastern Technical College, a technical college in the U.S. state of Georgia and into which Swainsboro Technical College was merged
Southeastern University (disambiguation)
Southeast University (disambiguation)